Zaireichthys mandevillei is a species of loach catfish found in the Central African Republic and the Democratic Republic of the Congo where it is found in the Congo River Basin.  It grows to a length of 2.6 cm and has a broad, black collar just behind the head and a spotted colour pattern.  The barbels are attenuate, with the maxillary barbels extending posteriorly to middle to end of the pectoral fin spine and the caudal peduncle is slender.  The humeral process of the pectoral girdle is short and without denticulations.  The caudal fin is deeply forked, with the upper lobe much shorter and smaller than the lower lobe; also, the fin rays in lower lobe noticeable thicker than those in upper lobe.

References 
 

Amphiliidae
Fish of Africa
Fish described in 1959
Taxa named by Max Poll